Dean Young (1955 – August 23rd, 2022) was a contemporary American poet in the poetic lineage of John Ashbery, Frank O'Hara, and Kenneth Koch. Often cited as a second-generation New York School poet, Young also derived influence and inspiration from the work of André Breton, Paul Éluard, and the other French Surrealist poets.

Life
He was born in Columbia, Pennsylvania. He received his MFA from Indiana University.

In 2008, Young became the William Livingston Chair of Poetry of the Michener Center for Writers at the University of Texas at Austin.

His most recent books are Solar Perplexus, Bender: New and Selected Poems, and Fall Higher.

In an interview, Young said his poems are about misunderstanding and that tying meaning too closely with understanding is not the intent of his poetry. He finds the process of creation to be more important than the work itself: his poems are more demonstrations than explanations. He also finds that using mangled quotes from technical journals, as he experimented with in First Course in Turbulence, allows for a kind of collage in which tones confront each other. Citing Breton as an influence, Young finds Surrealism useful in understanding the imagination and removing the boundaries between real and unreal.

In 2011, Young had a heart transplant. The possibility of his death and encounters with impermanence are frequent themes in his poetry, especially in Fall Higher, which was published days after his transplant.

Young died due to complications from COVID-19 on August 23rd, 2022  at Good Samaritan Hospital in Cincinnati, Ohio. He was 67 years old.

Awards
He was awarded the Colorado Prize for Poetry for Strike Anywhere, has received a Stegner Fellowship from Stanford University, and has been awarded fellowships by the John Simon Guggenheim Memorial Foundation (2002) as well as from the National Endowment for the Arts and the Fine Arts Work Center in Provincetown, Massachusetts. His work has been included in The Best American Poetry anthology multiple times, dating back to 1993.

Elegy on Toy Piano (2005), was a finalist for the Pulitzer Prize for Poetry.

Young was the Poet Laureate for Texas in 2014.

Bibliography

Collections

Beloved Infidel (1992) Originally published by Wesleyan University Press.
Strike Anywhere (1995)
First Course in Turbulence (1999)
Skid (2002)
Ready-Made Bouquet (Published by Stride, 2005)
Elegy on Toy Piano (2005)
Embryoyo (2007)
Primitive Mentor (2008) (shortlisted for the 2009 International Griffin Poetry Prize)
7 Poets, 4 Days, 1 Book (Trinity University Press, 2009)
31 Poems, 1988-2008 (published by Forklift, Ink, 2009)
The Foggist (2009)
The Art of Recklessness (2010)
Fall Higher (Copper Canyon Press, 2011)
Bender: New and Selected Poems (Copper Canyon Press, 2012)
Shock by Shock (Copper Canyon Press, 2015)
Solar Perplexus (Copper Canyon Press, 2019)

List of poems
PoemHunter.com - Some poems by Dean Young.
Ode to Hangover - text and audio file of Young reading the poem aloud.
Poem Without Forgiveness from the Paris Review
The Business of Love is Cruelty poem by Dean Young
Three poems from Jacket Magazine
Exit Ovidian, poem from Boston Review
Flood Plain, poem from Pool Magazine
Acceptance Speech, from Poetry Magazine
Bronzed, from Poetry Magazine

References

External links
Griffin Poetry Prize biography, including video clip of reading of Dean Young poem
Poets.org - A brief biography.
PoetryFoundation.org - A very brief biography with links to several poems.
Dean Young on Poemist - A brief information and list of poems.
excerpt from interview in Jubilat
University of Texas faculty profile
 - Dean Young needs a heart transplant (donate)
 Dean Young's poem "Light-Bringers" in Gulf Coast: A Journal of Literature and Fine Arts (25.1).

Poets from Pennsylvania
1955 births
Living people
American male poets
Surrealist poets
National Endowment for the Arts Fellows
People from Columbia, Pennsylvania
20th-century American poets
21st-century American poets